Delonix elata is a species of flowering plant in the family Fabaceae. Common names in English include white gul mohur, creamy peacock flower and yellow gul mohur.

References

External links

elata